Kanhur Pathar is a village in Ahmednagar District, Maharashtra, India.

History
'Sarkarwada' is a historical monument in the form of a small ground fortress or Gadhi. Once upon a time it was a walled village called Gaon KusIn under the reign of Peshwas of Pune.

To the south is a big hillock named 'Dashabai'. According to the British gazette, this hilltop has the ruined tomb of the 'Chand Sultana' of Ahmednagar Nizamshahi. Vitthal Temple and mosque are adjacent which shows a rare tie up between two communities. Other famous sites are:
 Wadgaon Darya famous for its stalactite & stalagmite columns in Goddess Daryabai's temple.
 Khandoba Mandir of Pimpalgaon Rotha built in the 15th century.
 A huge bull (Nandi) carved out of stone in Mahadev temple.
 Malganga mandir

People
The majority of the population in Kanhur Pathar is Hindu along with Muslims. People of all communities live here. Majority of them are Maratha & Mali. The  surname Thube & Navale dominates the scenario of Kanhur. Other popular surnames are Londhe,Vyavahare & Ghodake. Navale wadi, Thube Mala,Aadarsh Nagar and Londhe Mala are hamlets of Kanhur.

Majority of people are literate. The old trend of earning bread by doing unskilled labour work in Mumbai is slowly diminishing. Education is the main motive of youngsters for survival.

It is drought prone, semi arid region receiving scanty rainfall of around 20". Frequent droughts make life of local dwellers and farmers unbearable. So people migrate to cities or other places.

Agricultural area of Kanhur is situated nearly on ridge line of Krishna (Bhima) and Godavari basin.  Local farmers rear cows for milk and produce green peas to survive the unfavourable conditions.

References 

Villages in Ahmednagar district
Villages in Parner taluka